Shri Ram Murti Smarak College of Engineering and Technology (SRMSCET) Unnao, also known as SRMS CET Unnao or SRMS CET Lucknow is a private-unaided engineering college of SRMS Institutions in the Lucknow region of Uttar Pradesh  situated at  35 km on Lucknow -Kanpur Highway, Village Ashakhera-Kushari, Unnao, Uttar Pradesh, India.   Founded in the memory of the late Shri Ram Murti Ji, it is managed and run by SRMS Trust and offers undergraduate courses as B.Tech. in engineering. Since its inception in 2011, the college has created a world-class learning environment with its state-of-the art infrastructure and qualified faculty members.

History 
This private engineering college of Uttar Pradesh (UP) was established in the year 2011 by SRMS Trust Lucknow to provide education and research in the field of engineering education in Lucknow, Unnao and Kanpur region. In the foundation year, the college got approval from AICTE for running B.Tech. courses. The first class of B. Tech started in 2011.

Approval and affiliation
SRMS CET Unnao and its all courses are approved by the All India Council for Technical Education, New Delhi and affiliated to Dr. A.P.J. Abdul Kalam Technical University (AKTU), Lucknow. Dr A P J Abdul Kalam Technical University was formerly known as Uttar Pradesh Technical University (UPTU), Lucknow.  The college has institution code 745 with AKTU.

Academic programme

The college offers following undergraduate engineering courses.

Bachelor of Technology in Computer Science and Engineering (B. Tech in CSE)
Bachelor of Technology in Mechanical Engineering (B. Tech in ME)
Bachelor of Technology in Electronics & Communication Engineering (B. Tech in ECE)

Departments
The course of this college and its academics are managed by following departments.

 Department of Mechanical Engineering
 Department of Electronics and Communication Engineering
 Department of Computer Science and Engineering
 Department of Basic Engineering Sciences and Humanities

Eligibility for admissions

Admissions are offered in the first and second year of B. Tech Courses, according to the norms and guidelines of Affiliating University and State Government.

For admissions in the first year of B.Tech., the candidate must have passed 10+2 level examination from recognized board with aggregate 60% marks in physics, chemistry and mathematics. Further, candidate must have passed each subject of 10+2 examination without grace. Admissions for the management seats are granted through SRMS EET which is a common entrance test of SRMS Engineering Institutions of Bareilly and Lucknow. Candidates with a three-year diploma from a recognized technical education board, with 60% marks, are eligible for admissions in the second year of the courses under lateral entry scheme.

Campus life
The college campus is located in a pollution free neat and clean environment. The facilities for outdoor and indoor sports are available in the campus. A modern gymnasium is also available in the campus. The labs and  library remains open till 11:00pm. The hostels are situated in the campus which provides a safe and disciplined environment for the students.

Merit scholarship

College offers merit scholarship to all students who secures 75% and above marks in their passing examinations.

Convocation
Each year the college recognizes merits of the students and honours them during convocation of SRMS Institutions on 8 February.

Research and development
The academics of the college is enriched with research by the faculty members and students. The Innovation and Incubation cell works with industries also to get the sponsored projects as well as to facilitate the innovations and creativity among the students. The research and development cell of SRMS manages following activities.

 Technological Innovation 
 Campus Outreach
 Projects and Consultancy
 INSPIRE Internship

SRMS institutions 

The following SRMS institutions, with years of establishment, have been established and managed by SRMS Trust at Bareilly, Lucknow and Unnao. 
 Shri Ram Murti Smarak College of Engineering and Technology, Bareilly(1996)
 Shri Ram Murti Smarak  College of Engineering and Technology (Pharmacy), Bareilly (2000)
 Shri Ram Murti Smarak Multi Super specialty Tertiary Care Hospital and Trauma Centre, Bareilly (2002)
 Shri Ram Murti Smarak Institute of Medical Sciences Bareilly (2005)
 Shri Ram Murti Smarak  School of Nursing, Bareilly (2006)
 Shri Ram Murti Smarak College of Engineering, Technology & Research, Bareilly (2008)
 Shri Ram Murti Smarak R R Cancer Institute and Research Centre, Bareilly (2008)
 Shri Ram Murti Smarak  Institute of Paramedical Sciences, Bareilly (2011)
Shri Ram Murti Smarak  International Business School, Lucknow(2011)
 Shri Ram Murti Smarak College of Engineering and Technology, Unnao (2011)
 Shri Ram Murti Smarak Functional Imaging and Medical Centre, Lucknow (2015)
Shri Ram Murti Smarak College of Nursing, Bareilly (2017)

See also
 All India Council for Technical Education
 Dr A P J Abdul Kalam Technical University

References

External links

Private engineering colleges in Uttar Pradesh
Education in Unnao
2011 establishments in Uttar Pradesh
All India Council for Technical Education
Engineering colleges in Uttar Pradesh
Engineering universities and colleges in India
Dr. A.P.J. Abdul Kalam Technical University